Data Darbar (also spelt Data Durbar), located in the city of Lahore (Punjab, Pakistan), is the largest Sufi shrine in South Asia. It was built to house the remains of Ali Hujwiri, commonly known as Data Ganj Baksh, a Sufi saint from Ghazni in present-day Afghanistan, who is believed to have lived on the site in the 11th century CE. 

The site is considered to be the most sacred place in Lahore, and attracts up to one million visitors to its annual urs festival.

Location
Data Darbar is located in the centre of Old City Lahore. Surrounding it are Lower Mall Road, Bhati Gate, Gawalmandi & Karbala Gamay Shah.

History
The shrine was originally established as a simple grave next to the mosque which Ali Hujwiri had built on the outskirts of Lahore in the 11th century. By the 13th century, the belief that the spiritual powers of great Sufi saints were attached to their burial sites was widespread in the Muslim world, and so a larger shrine was built to commemorate the burial site of Hujwiri during the Mughal period. The shrine complex was expanded in the 19th century, and Hujwiri's mosque rebuilt.
The shrine came under Pakistani government control as part of the Auquf Ordinance of 1960, with the official aim of preventing shrine caretakers throughout the country from financially exploiting devotees. The shrine was greatly expanded in the 1980s under the rule of military dictator Zia ul-Haq, during which time the shrine became the largest in South Asia. Offices for NGOs, a library, madrasa, police station, carpark, and offices were all added under his regime. Designated spaces for musical performances, and new free kitchen were also added during that time. New markets have emerged around the site since its massive expansion.

Since 1965, the mehfil-e-sama, a 2-day qawwali music festival, had been held adjacent to the shrine, which in 1992 shifted to a nearby school.

Terror attacks 
On  2010, two suicide bombers attacked the shrine. At least 50 people were killed, and 200 others were hurt in the blasts.  On 8 May 2019, another blast at the same site killed twelve people included police officials Saddam Hussain, Head Constable Shahid Nazir, Head Constable Muhammad Sohail, Head Constable Gulzar Ahmad, Constable Muhammad Saleem, and security guard Rafaqat Ali near the entrance gate for female visitors.

Architecture 

The shrine of Hujwiri is housed in a Mughal era tomb crafted of carved white marble. The tomb is surrounded by a massive marble courtyard, while a new educational institution at the shrine complex utilizes modernist architecture.

Significance
The site is considered to be the most sacred place in Lahore. The shrine has emerged a major economic, political, and social centre in Lahore, and is one of the only places in Lahore where the extremely rich and extremely poor share space together.

It is widely believed among devotees that the saint interred at the shrine is the supreme authority over all Sufi saints in the Indian subcontinent, and that no new Sufi saint could immigrate to the subcontinent without obtaining permission from the spirit of Hujwiri.

Following the establishment of a shrine dedicated to Hujwiri, his tomb was visited by Muslims and non-Muslims in search of his blessings. Illustrious figures such as Baba Farid, Moinuddin Chishti, Nizamuddin Auliya, Dara Shikoh, and Allama Iqbal all paid obeisance to the shrine, and pledged allegiance to Hujwiri. Former Prime Minister Nawaz Sharif was a frequent visitor to the shrine.

Hujwiri's teachings were critical of practices associated with South Asian Islam, such as the use of drugs, and dancing. He also taught that Sufi saints were themselves still obliged to the demands of Islam, and so is revered by reformist Muslims who are critical of Sufi practice, as well as traditionalist Muslims who revere Sufi shrines.

Qawwali performances are regularly held at the shrine. On special occasions, the shrine is decorated with lights, dinner is prepared for thousands of visitors, who also partake in dance while musicians play Sufi music for hours. At the boundary of the shrine, Muslim faithfuls recite the Qur'an, and pay tributes to the Prophet Muhammad.

Social services
The shrine provides a wide array of social services which have made it a popular hub for impoverished residents. In a custom that is 1,000 years old, up to 50,000 visitors per day are offered free food at the shrine. Patrons facing personal difficulties frequently donate money or labour to the shrine's free-kitchen fund, in line with Islam's emphasis on feeding the poor. The shrine also provides for students' education in nearby schools, and helps fund local hospitals as part of its social mission.

Access
The shrine remains open at all hours, and welcomes visitors who freely enter the complex. The shrine is visited by approximately 30,000 to 60,000 visitors on a daily basis, though the number can double on religious holidays, and on Thursdays - the traditional night for visiting shrines. Approximately 1,000,000 devotees visit the shrine during its annual urs festival.

The shrine is served by the Bhatti Chowk station of the Lahore Metrobus.

Administration
The shrine is managed as part of an Auqaf foundation as part of the Auqaf Ordinance of 1960. The shrine is managed by approximately 200 full-time workers, excluding security services. The shrine produces the most revenue for the Auqaf board out of all the some 400 shrines under its control in Punjab province, and contributes approximately 33% of the board's revenue. The shrine collects 4 times more income than is spent on the shrine's upkeep. Considered to be the centre of all shrines in Punjab, religious practices and sermons are subject to more government regulation than at other shrines in Pakistan.

Gallery

See also
 List of mausolea and shrines in Pakistan
 Sufism

References

External links

 Data Darbar Web Site
 Fateh Qaloob A Research Book About Data Darbar and Data Ganj Bakhsh
 Information about the complex
 Photos of the Data Darbar complex
 Details about the construction

Sufi shrines in Pakistan
Mosques in Lahore
Mausoleums in Punjab, Pakistan
Buildings and structures in Lahore
Walled City of Lahore
Ziyarat
Shrines in Lahore
Barelvi